Turcinoemacheilus kosswigi is a species of stone loach which is endemic to the Tigris-Euphrates Basin where it can be found in the stretches of rivers, eve small streams, with faster currents and it often occurs on riffles and rapids. The specific name honours the zoologist and geneticist Curt Kosswig (1903-1982), who collected the type specimen of this species among others he collected in Turkey.

References

Nemacheilidae
Fish of Asia
Fish described in 1964
Taxa named by Petre Mihai Bănărescu
Taxa named by Teodor T. Nalbant